KDVA (106.9 FM, "La Suavecita 106.9") is a radio station licensed to serve Buckeye, Arizona.  The station is owned by Entravision Communications and licensed to Entravision Holdings, LLC. It airs a Spanish language Adult Hits music format.  Its studios are located in Phoenix near Sky Harbor Airport, and the transmitter is located near Buckeye.

The station was assigned the KDVA call letters by the U.S. Federal Communications Commission (FCC) on February 1, 2001.

History

KDVA signed on the air in 1992 as adult R&B KMJK.  KMJK was constructed as a docket 80-90 CP to facilitate minority ownership.  The original licensee and architect was Arthur Mobley.  KMJK was owned and operated by Mobley Broadcasting Incorporated and featured a variety of music, news/talk and sports. In 1994, the license was transferred by Mobley to Arizona Radio, Inc., an affiliate of Syndicated Communications Venture Partners (Syncom), a minority investment fund based in Silver Spring, Maryland, while Mobley maintained operating control.  On December 7, 2000, Entravision acquired both KVVA-FM and KMJK and combined the two into a simulcast for its "Radio Romántica" format. In 2005 KDVA switched to a format branded as "Super Estrella" as part of the "Super Estrella" satellite network. In 2011, it changed to the current "Radio José" branding while maintaining a similar format.

In 2010 and again in 2017, the station filed to move to 106.7 MHz. The latter application was denied in July 2018 because it was contingent on changes to KVVA-FM denied by the FCC in order to license Aguila's KAZV.

References

External links
 KDVA official website

DVA
DVA
Mass media in Maricopa County, Arizona
Entravision Communications stations
Regional Mexican radio stations in the United States
Adult hits radio stations in the United States